Larghi is an Italian surname. Notable people with the surname include:

 Bernardino Larghi (1812–1877), Italian surgeon
 Thiago Larghi (born 1980), Brazilian football manager

Italian-language surnames